In Māori tradition, Waipapa was one of the great ocean-going, voyaging canoes that was used in the migrations that settled New Zealand. In the Māori traditions of Northland, the Waipapa is said to have landed in Doubtless Bay. The captain asked his crew to take tawapou log rollers off the canoe, which had been carried from Hawaiki, and plant them on the slopes of a nearby hill. From the rollers grew a grove of tawapou trees that today serve as a memorial of the arrival of the canoe.

See also
List of Māori waka

Māori waka
Māori mythology